Thysanophora is a genus of gastropods belonging to the family Thysanophoridae.

The species of this genus are found in America.

Species:

Thysanophora alta 
Thysanophora amita 
Thysanophora balboa 
Thysanophora beatensis 
Thysanophora canalis 
Thysanophora clarionensis 
Thysanophora conspurcatella 
Thysanophora costaricensis 
Thysanophora impura 
Thysanophora incrustata 
Thysanophora ingersolli
Thysanophora jaliscoensis 
Thysanophora materna 
Thysanophora meermani 
Thysanophora plagioptycha 
Thysanophora proxima 
Thysanophora pruinosa 
Thysanophora rojasi 
Thysanophora santanaensis 
Thysanophora venezuelensis

References

Gastropods